David Feiss (born 1959) is an American animator, storyboard artist, screenwriter, and director. Feiss began his career working for Hanna-Barbera in the late 1970s. He received his first credit for the 1981 adult animated film Heavy Metal. He gained notoriety throughout the late 1980s and 1990s as an animator for Jetsons: The Movie, Once Upon a Forest, The Town Santa Forgot, and The Ren & Stimpy Show, among others.

In 1995, Cartoon Network, in search of aspiring creators of original programming, launched their animated series What a Cartoon!, which featured a showcase of animated shorts from up-and-coming animators, including Craig McCracken, Genndy Tartakovsky, and Van Partible. Feiss' pilot, "No Smoking", was among the first shorts broadcast on the network and follows the unconventional sibling rivalry between a young cow named Cow and her older brother, a chicken named Chicken, as well as their human parents. The pilot was approved by the network for a full series run, which premiered on July 15, 1997, and ran for four seasons. A spin-off series following the duo of I.M. Weasel and I.R. Baboon, two characters featured in intermediate segments of Cow and Chicken, premiered on June 10, 1999, as a standalone series and ran for one season.

Since Cow and Chicken and I Am Weasel, Feiss has continued to work in the animation industry on projects such as The Grim Adventures of Billy & Mandy, Dave the Barbarian, Open Season, Despicable Me 2, The Grinch, The Willoughbys,  Hotel Transylvania: Transformania, and Minions: The Rise of Gru.

Biography 
Feiss was born in Sacramento, California. He joined Hanna-Barbera around 1978 while still a teenager after graduating Casa Roble High School.

He worked on the 1980s revival of The Jetsons, was a key animator on the Jetsons movie, co-animated the Ren and Stimpy pilot "Big House Blues", was an animation director on The Ren & Stimpy Show during its first season and created the Cartoon Network original series Cow and Chicken and its spin-off, I Am Weasel. Feiss stated that The Adventures of Rocky and Bullwinkle and Friends was the primary influence for his work. On his shows, David directed every episode and also worked as a writer, his writing credits usually collaborated with Michael Ryan.

Feiss co-directed the animated segments of The Adventures of Hyperman, a computer game released in 1995 by IBM.

In issues #5 and #30 of his cousin Sam Kieth's comic book The Maxx, David showcased his work with The Crappon (which looks like the Warner Bros. frog mascot Michigan J. Frog), Fred Flower and Uncle Italian Moose, which had a very similar style to Cow and Chicken (they are reprinted in WildStorm's The Maxx Volumes 1 and 5 trades). Feiss also collaborated with Kieth on a story featured in Parody Press's 1992 one-shot comic book Pummeler, spoofing Marvel Comics' famous character The Punisher.

In 2006, he was the head of story for Sony's first CG animated film, Open Season.

Filmography

Accolades 
David Feiss has received an array of critical accolades since his entrance to the animation industry.

References

External links 
 

1959 births
Animators from California
American film directors
American male screenwriters
American male voice actors
American storyboard artists
American television directors
Television producers from California
American television writers
American animated film directors
American male television writers
People from Brampton
Sony Pictures Animation people
Artists from Sacramento, California
Living people
Cartoon Network Studios people
Hanna-Barbera people
American graphic designers
Screenwriters from California
Illumination (company) people